Susan A. David (born September 13, 1970) is a South African psychologist, speaker and author.

Early life 
David was born in 1970, in Gauteng, South Africa. She attended Waverly Girls High School from 1984 to 1988. David received her BA in Applied Psychology & English (1992), Honors in Applied Psychology (1995), and her MA in Psychology (2000) from the University of Witwatersrand in Johannesburg. David got a PhD in clinical psychology from the University of Melbourne. David then conducted post-doctoral research in emotions at Yale University.

Career 
David founded the management consulting firm Evidence Based Psychology in 2005 and serves as its CEO. David co-founded the Harvard/McLean Institute of Coaching in 2009 and served as co-director. David edited the 2013 books Beyond Goals and The Oxford Handbook of Happiness. David wrote the self-help book Emotional Agility, which was published with Penguin Random House in 2016. Emotional Agility talks about the concept of productively managing and accepting emotions. Emotional Agility reached #1 on The Wall Street Journal bestseller list. The concept of emotional agility was named as the best business management idea of the year by Harvard Business Review. David gave a TED talk in January 2018 called "The Gift and Power of Emotional Courage". By the end of 2018 it had 6 million views on the TED website.

Personal life 
David lives in Boston, Massachusetts with her husband and two children.

Awards 
2016 Best Business Management Idea of the Year
2016 Books for a Better Life Award Winner | Psychology
2017 Thinkers50 Breakthrough Idea of the Year
2017 Axiom Business Book Award Medalist

References

External links
 "The gift and power of emotional courage" (TED talk), 2017.
 "How to be your best self in times of crisis" (TED talk), March 23, 2020.

University of the Witwatersrand alumni
South African psychologists
South African women psychologists
Clinical psychologists
Psychology writers
1970 births
Living people
University of Melbourne alumni
South African expatriates in Australia
South African expatriates in the United States